Weiss is an unincorporated community in Livingston Parish, Louisiana, United States.

History
In 1894 a local man named Fred Nesom and his father Henry Nesom began organizing the community and sought the help of a German man named Fred Weiss who was the postmaster in the nearby community of Fred, Louisiana. Fred Weiss submitted the paperwork and proposed the name Weiss and it was accepted. The post office was closed sometime in April 1949.

References

Unincorporated communities in Livingston Parish, Louisiana
Unincorporated communities in Louisiana